Haidar Usmonov is a jamoat in north-west Tajikistan. It is located in Ghafurov District in Sughd Region. The jamoat has a total population of 37,017 (2015).

References

Populated places in Sughd Region
Jamoats of Tajikistan